Callipogonius cornutus is a species of beetle in the family Cerambycidae. It was described by Linsley in 1930. It is known from United States and Mexico.

References

Pogonocherini
Beetles described in 1930
Taxa named by Earle Gorton Linsley